Lire may refer to:
 Lire (magazine), a French literary magazine
 Lira (plural lire), a monetary unit in several countries
 Liré, a former commune in France
 Lire Phiri, Mosotho footballer
 Pratica di Mare Air Base, an Italian Air Force base in Rome
 The Leaning Tower of Lire, see block-stacking problem.

See also 
 Lira (disambiguation)
 Lyre (disambiguation)